Kana Kanmani may refer to:

 Kana Kanmani (film), a 2009 family horror film
 Kana Kanmani (2016 TV series), a Malayalam soap opera
 Kana Kanmani (2021 TV series), a Malayalam soap opera